A Fool There Was is a 1914 American film featuring Oliver Hardy. The title was changed to She Wanted a Car after the release of the 1915 film starring Theda Bara also titled A Fool There Was.

Plot

Cast
 Jerold T. Hevener as George
 Mabel Paige as Bess
 Frank Griffin as The Chauffeur (as Frank C. Griffin)
 Oliver Hardy as Traffic Cop (as Babe Hardy)

See also
 List of American films of 1914
 Oliver Hardy filmography

External links

1914 films
1914 short films
American silent short films
American black-and-white films
Silent American comedy films
1914 comedy films
Films directed by Frank Griffin
Lubin Manufacturing Company films
American comedy short films
1910s American films